Winston McArthur (born 1 January 1932) is a Guyanese weightlifter. He competed in the men's middleweight event at the 1956 Summer Olympics.

References

External links
 

1932 births
Possibly living people
Guyanese male weightlifters
Olympic weightlifters of British Guiana
Weightlifters at the 1956 Summer Olympics
Place of birth missing (living people)
Commonwealth Games medallists in weightlifting
Commonwealth Games silver medallists for British Guiana
Weightlifters at the 1958 British Empire and Commonwealth Games
20th-century Guyanese people
Medallists at the 1958 British Empire and Commonwealth Games